Franz Friedrich 'Fritz' Grünbaum (7 April 1880 in Brünn (Brno), Moravia  – 14 January 1941 at the Dachau concentration camp, Germany) was an Austrian Jewish cabaret artist, operetta and popular song writer, actor, and master of ceremonies whose art collection was looted by Nazis before he was murdered in the Holocaust.

Early life and education
Grünbaum was born and grew up in Brünn, then the capital of the Margraviate of Moravia (now Brno, Czech Republic). He later stated his father's occupation as "art dealer". From 4 October 1899 to 31 July 1903, he studied at the Law Faculty of the University of Vienna, lodging in the 2nd district like the majority of Jewish migrants to Vienna. He did not complete a doctorate in law, so could not practise, but left with the equivalent of a master's degree. While still a student, he worked as a journalist and as a legal advisor to the finance department and the police in Brünn and began a literary association there, the Neue Akademische Vereinigung für Kunst und Literatur, which brought many contemporary writers to the city.

Career 
In 1906, he returned to Vienna and became master of ceremonies at a new cabaret in the basement of the Theater an der Wien called  (Hell); it opened on 7 October 1906 with Phryne, the first operetta for which he wrote the libretto (with Robert Bodanzky). In 1907, when he was on stage presenting at the cabaret, an officer made an anti-Semitic heckling remark; Grünbaum boxed his ears and subsequently fought a sabre and pistols duel with him and was wounded.

From 1907 to 1910 he left Vienna for Berlin, under contract as a master of ceremonies with Rudolf Nelson after a first appearance at Nelson's Chat noir cabaret. He then returned to Vienna, where he worked at Die Hölle for two more years and then at Simplicissimus (now ). He was now well known for rhymed monologues, libretti, and song lyrics.

His career was interrupted in 1915 by service as a volunteer in the First World War, but his work continued to be performed and he continued to write, including pacifist poetry published only after war's end. Grünbaum also appeared frequently as a master of ceremonies in Berlin.

In the 1920s, he moved frequently between Vienna and Berlin, where in 1921 he met Karl Farkas; in 1922 they began collaborating as masters of ceremony, both extemporising rhyme, the so-called Doppelconférence for which they became famous.

He also became more politically engaged. In September 1925 he began a weekly column of verse commentary in the Vienna Neue 8 Uhr-Blatt, and in April 1927 was a co-signatory of the Kundgebung für ein geistiges Wien, calling for intellectual freedom to be guaranteed. When the power failed during a performance, he once quipped: "I can't see a thing, not a single thing; I must have stumbled into National Socialist culture."

Following the Nazi seizure of power in 1933, Jewish performers were forbidden to appear in Germany, and many moved to Vienna. Grünbaum was the subject of an article in Der Stürmer the following year. His and Farkas' last revue, Metro Grünbaum – Farkas tönende Wochenschau, premièred on 29 February 1938; on 12 March, the Nazis marched into Austria and the show closed after two weeks.

Nazi persecution and murder

Grünbaum and his wife, Lilly, attempted to flee to Czechoslovakia, but were caught. Initially he was interned in Vienna as a political undesirable, rather than a Jew; on 24 May 1938, together with Morgan, Fritz Löhner-Beda and Hermann Leopoldi, he was deported to Dachau concentration camp. He was transported from there to Buchenwald on 23 September 1938, and on 4 October 1940 back to Dachau. He continued to quip, for example musing on the effectiveness of starvation as a cure for diabetes and in response to a guard refusing him soap, saying that those who did not have enough money for soap had no business running a concentration camp. After a final performance on New Year's Eve for his fellow inmates, he died on 14 January 1941.

A star was dedicated to him on the Walk of Fame of Cabaret in Mainz, Germany. He is buried in Vienna Central Cemetery, Old Israelite Part, Gate 1.

Marriages
Fritz Grünbaum was married three times. On 1 August 1908, he married , a fellow cabarettist whom he had met at the Chat noir; they were divorced in December 1914, and she died in 1930. He then married singer Mizzi Dressl. On 10 November 1919 he was married for the last time, to Elisabeth "Lilly" Herzl. She was evicted from their flat in Vienna on 15 July 1938, moving in with a friend, Elsa Klauber; after several forced relocations, they were both deported on 5 October 1942 to the Maly Trostenets extermination camp, where she died on 9 October.

Art collection

Starting in the 1920s, Grünbaum amassed a well known art collection, especially of Austrian modernist art, works from which were featured in catalogues and exhibitions. The collection came to include over 400 pieces, including 80 by Egon Schiele. The collection disappeared during the Nazi period. In the early 1950s, approximately 25% appeared on the art market through Swiss art dealer Eberhard Kornfeld. The fate of the rest is unknown.

Grünbaum's heirs have fought to gain possession of works that were once part of his collection. In 2005, an attempt to reclaim Schiele's Seated Woman With Bent Left Leg (Torso) was thwarted when the court deemed that too much time had passed for the heirs to lay claim to it.  

The heirs won their first victory in 2014, when a Schiele watercolor, Town on the Blue River, was sold by the Christie’s auction house under an acknowledgment that Grünbaum was a previous owner, with a share of the proceeds reserved for his heirs. The most recent case, which has been wending its way through the courts since 2015, has  produced an even bigger victory. In 2019, a New York trial court ruled in favor of the heirs and against the London art dealer Richard Nagy who had claimed ownership. Then, in 2022, the New York Court of Appeals upheld the lower court’s decision, 5-0. Justice Anil Singh wrote, “We reject the notion that a person who signs a power of attorney in a death camp can be said to have executed the document voluntarily. ... Any subsequent transfer of the artworks did not convey legal title.”

The Grünbaum family also requested that the Leopold Museum restore to them Schiele's watercolor Tote Stadt III (1911), which they said had been looted by the Nazis.

Selected works
Die Dollarprinzessin (Operetta by Leo Fall, 1907, with A. M. Willner)
The Dollar Princess (Operetta by Leo Fall, 1909, with A. M. Willner, English adaptation by Basil Hood)
Der Liebeswalzer (Operetta by Karl Michael Ziehrer, 1908, with Robert Bodanzky)
Der Zigeunerprimas (Operetta by Emmerich Kálmán, 1912, with )
Sturmidyll (Comedy, 1914, with )
Der Favorit (Operetta by Robert Stolz, with Wilhelm Sterk, 1916)
Die Csikósbaroness (Operetta by Georg Jarno, 1920)
Dorine und der Zufall (Musical comedy by Jean Gilbert, 1922, with Wilhelm Sterk)
 Die Schöpfung (Cabaret)
 Die Hölle im Himmel (Cabaret)
 Die Schöpfung und andere Kabarettstücke, Vienna/Munich: Löcker Verlag, 1984, 
 Der leise Weise. Gedichte und Monologue aus dem Repertoire, ed. Hans Veigl, Vienna, 1992, 
 Hallo, hier Grünbaum!, Vienna/Munich: Löcker Verlag, 2001,

Lyrics
"Draußen in Schönbrunn"
"Ich hab das Fräuln Helen baden sehn"

Filmography
Rich, Young and Beautiful, directed by Fritz Freisler (1928, based on the musical comedy Dorine und der Zufall)
The Gypsy Chief, directed by Carl Wilhelm (1929, based on the operetta Der Zigeunerprimas)
Die Csikósbaroness, directed by Jacob Fleck and Luise Fleck (1930, based on the operetta Die Csikósbaroness)

Screenwriter
Everyone Asks for Erika, directed by Frederic Zelnik (1931)
, directed by Géza von Bolváry (1931)
, directed by Géza von Bolváry (1932)

Actor
 The Theft of the Mona Lisa (1931)
 My Wife, the Impostor (1931), as Silbermann
 The Virtuous Sinner (1931), as Kalapka
 Poor as a Church Mouse (1931), as Schünzl
  (1932)
  (1932), as Adolph Münzer
 Man Without a Name (1932), as Erwin Gablinky
 Things Are Getting Better Already (1932), as Justizrat Feldacker
 Girls to Marry (1932), as Sigurd Bernstein

Sources 

 Christoph Wagner-Trenkwitz and Marie-Theres Arnbom, Grüß mich Gott! Fritz Grünbaum 1880–1941, Brandstätter, 2005, 
 Viktor Rotthaler, "Frühling für Hitler. Dani Levys historische Vorbilder", Frankfurter Rundschau, 13 January 2007, p. 15
 Das Cabaret ist mein Ruin – 2 CDs (CD1: Chansons, Conferencen und Texte von (und mit) Fritz Grünbaum. CD2: Feature über Fritz Grünbaum von Volker Kühn), Ed. Mnemosyne, Neckargemünd/Vienna: Verl. für Alte Hüte & Neue Medien, February 2005, 
 Hans Veigl, "Entwürfe für ein Grünbaum-Monument. Fritz Grünbaum und das Wiener Kabarett", Graz/Vienna: ÖKA, 2001, 
 Ernst Federn, "Fritz Grünbaums 60. Geburtstag im Konzentrationslager", in: Roland Kaufhold, ed., Versuche zur Psychologie des Terrors, Gießen: Psychosozial-Verlag, 1999, pp. 95–97.

See also 
List of claims for restitution for Nazi-looted art
The Holocaust in Austria

References

External links 

 
 Blog about Fritz Gruenbaum's looted art collection
 The Lost art Internet Database of the Koordinierungsstelle für Kulturgutverluste lists artworks known to be part of Gruenbaum's collection

1880 births
1941 deaths
Actors from Brno
Jewish cabaret performers
People from the Margraviate of Moravia
Austrian Jews who died in the Holocaust
Kabarettists
Austrian male writers
Austrian comedians
Austrian expatriates in Germany
Weimar cabaret
Masters of ceremonies
Jewish Austrian male actors
Austrian civilians killed in World War II
Austrian people who died in Dachau concentration camp
Jewish Austrian writers
Jewish musicians
20th-century comedians
Writers from Brno
Jewish art collectors
Moravian Jews
Nazi-looted art